The 2006 Qatar Telecom German Open was a women's tennis event that was played at the Rot-Weiss Tennis Club in Berlin, Germany from 5 May until 13 May 2006. It was one of two Tier I events that took place on red clay in the build-up to the second Grand Slam of the year, the French Open. Second-seeded Nadia Petrova won the singles title.

Finals

Singles

 Nadia Petrova defeated  Justine Henin-Hardenne 4–6, 6–4, 7–5

Doubles

 Yan Zi /  Zheng Jie defeated  Elena Dementieva /  Flavia Pennetta 6–2, 6–3

External links
 Official website
 ITF tournament edition details

Qatar Telecom German Open
Berlin
 
May 2006 sports events in Europe